is a Japanese actor and kabuki actor.

Filmography

Kabuki

New kabuki

TV drama

NHK

Nippon TV

Tokyo Broadcasting System

Fuji Television

TV Asahi

TV Tokyo

Films

Stage

Anime films

Video games

Educational programmes

References

External links
Kabuki Haiyū Meikan profile 

Kabuki actors
Japanese male dancers
Male actors from Tokyo
1973 births
Living people